A5 and variants may refer to:

Science and mathematics
 A5 regulatory sequence in biochemistry
 A5, the abbreviation for the androgen Androstenediol
 Annexin A5, a human cellular protein
 ATC code A05 Bile and liver therapy, a subgroup of the Anatomical Therapeutic Chemical Classification System
 British NVC community A5 (Ceratophyllum demersum community), a British Isles plants community
 Subfamily A5, a Rhodopsin-like receptors subfamily
 Noradrenergic cell group A5, a noradrenergic cell group located in the Pons
 A5 pod, a name given to a group of orcas (Orcinus orca) found off the coast of British Columbia, Canada
 A5, the strain at fracture of a material as measured with a load test on a cylindrical body of length 5 times its diameter
 A5, the alternating group on five elements

Technology
 Apple A5, the Apple mobile microprocessor
 ARM Cortex-A5, ARM applications processor

Sport and recreation
 A5 (classification), an amputee sport classification
 A5 grade (climbing)
 A5, an aid climbing gear manufacturer - absorbed by The North Face
 A05, Réti Opening Encyclopaedia of Chess Openings code
 A-5, a common shorthand name for the Browning Auto-5 shotgun
 Gibson A-5 mandolin, a Gibson mandolin
 Tippmann A-5, a semi-automatic pneumatic marker for playing paintball
 A5, an Atlanta-based volleyball club

Transport

Automobiles
 Arrows A5, a 1982 British Formula One racing car
 Audi A5, a 2007–present German compact executive car
 Chery A5, a 2006–2010 Chinese compact sedan
 Soueast A5, a 2019–present Chinese compact sedan
 Sehol A5, a 2019–present Chinese compact sedan, formerly JAC Jiayue A5

Other uses in transportation
 A5 road, in several countries
 Hall-Scott A-5, an engine powering the 1916 Standard H-2 aircraft
 Prussian A 5, a 1913 German railbus
 Route A5 (WMATA), a bus route operated by the Washington Metropolitan Area Transit Authority
 Airlinair, by IATA code
 Bhutan, by aircraft registration code
 ICON A5, an American amphibious aircraft
 Pennsylvania Railroad class A5s, an American locomotive
 Finnish Steam Locomotive Class A5
 LNER Class A5, a class of 4-6-2T steam locomotives

Military

Aircraft
 A-5, an export version of Nanchang Q-5, a Chinese-built jet fighter bomber
 Curtiss Falcon or A-5 Falcon, an attack aircraft manufactured by the Curtiss Aircraft Company
 Mitsubishi A5M, a 1930s Japanese fighter plane
 A-5 Vigilante, a carrier-based supersonic bomber designed for the United States Navy
 Focke-Wulf A 5, a World War I German Focke-Wulf aircraft
 Sturzkampfgeschwader 1, from its historic Geschwaderkennung code with the Luftwaffe in World War II

Other uses in military
  or USS Pike (SS-6), a 1903 United States Navy Plunger-class submarine
 , an A-class submarine of the Royal Navy
 Aggregate 5, a German rocket design, scaled down precursor to the V-2, in World War II
 A 5, a Swedish regiment designation, see list of Swedish artillery regiments
 A5, the staff designation for air force headquarters staff concerned with plans or strategy
 In the United Kingdom, the Joint Force Air Component Headquarters A5 - Air Strategy and GAT branch
 A5 Juggernaut, an armored fighting vehicle in the Star Wars fictional universe

Other uses
 A5 paper size, an ISO 216 international standard paper size (148 × 210 mm)
 A5, the highest grade of Japanese wagyu beef
 In Town and country planning in the United Kingdom, A5 is the code for permission to use specific land or premises for takeaways

See also
 A5/1, A5/2 and A5/3, ciphers used in cellular phones
 AV (disambiguation)
 Alpha 5 (disambiguation) (α5 / Α5)